Dugi Otok (Croatian for "Long Island") is the seventh largest island in the Adriatic Sea, part of Croatia. It is located off the Dalmatian coast, west of Zadar. Its elevation reaches 300 m; and many of its higher portions contain stands of Maritime Pine.

The western coast is tall and rugged, and many of the towns are clustered on the eastern side, including Sali, the largest, Zaglav, Žman, Luka, Savar, Brbinj, Dragove, Božava, Soline, Verunić (Verona) and Veli Rat. A nature park, Telašćica, covers the southern part of the island and is adjacent to Kornati Islands National Park. There are six islets and rocks in the Telašćica Bay: Korotan, Galijola, Gozdenjak, Farfarikulac, Gornji Školj and Donji Školj.

Population

Population Movement History

History

The island has been inhabited since prehistoric times, as evidenced by many archeological sites that have still not been fully investigated. The earliest findings date back to Paleolithic, and numerous hillforts and grave sites are evidence of continuous settlement throughout Eneolithic, Bronze Age and Iron Age.

The Byzantine Emperor Constantine VII in the 10th century mentioned it under the name of Pizuh, and later it was called Insula Tilagus in documents ("pelagos" in Greek means sea), and its Latin name was Insula maior. In the 15th century it was registered as Veli otok.

The old and main settlement on the island was located in the southern area. It has only been inhabited significantly since the Turkish invasions (15th-16th centuries). Until then the island belonged to Zadar monasteries and citizens. Nowadays there is a total of 11 settlements on the island, and they are all on the north-eastern side of the island concerned primarily with fishing, although salt was once produced here.

The village of Veli Rat is also home to the Veli Rat lighthouse, another spectacular sight. The beautiful island of Dugi Otok, with a Mediterranean climate and ancient Croatian culture, receives very few visitors. Olive oil, figs, cheese and wine accompany the seafood in the natives' diet. A definite step back in time, the island boasts an ancient church and some Roman ruins. It is in close proximity to Kornati.

Description

More than 1500 hectares are covered with vineyards, orchards and arable land, about 752 hectares are pasture land and about 300 hectares undergrowth which in some places is used as a forest land. The vegetation is more pronounced in the northern and central areas of the island. The south-eastern part belong to the Kornati.

The road from Telašćica to Veli Rat, along the length of the island, connects all the settlements.

Geology

Gallery

See also
 Šibenik

References

Sources

External links
 

 
Islands of Croatia
Islands of the Adriatic Sea
Landforms of Zadar County